Garbicz  (German: "Görbitsch") is a village in the administrative district of Gmina Torzym, within Sulęcin County, Lubusz Voivodeship, in western Poland.

The village has a population of 312.

Each year in the beginning of August, the village hosts the Garbicz techno festival.

References

Garbicz